The Institute of Engineering Technology (IET) is a diploma-awarding institute in Katunayake, Sri Lanka, specializing in the field of engineering. IET awards the National Diploma in Engineering Sciences (NDES), and was established as the Technician Training Institute (TTI) in 1985 to educate and train mid-level engineers in various engineering-based and allied fields.

Courses 
IET awards the National Diploma in Engineering Sciences under the three major fields of civil engineering, electrical engineering and mechanical engineering, and eight sub-fields.
There are 8 sub fields under above three fields; those are,
 Civil Engineering
 Civil Building and Structural Engineering
 Civil Highway and Railway Engineering 
 Civil Water and Environmental Engineering

 Electrical Engineering
 Electronic & Communication Engineering
 Power Engineering
 Mechanical Engineering

 Mechanical Automobile Engineering
 Mechanical General (Production and Controlling) Engineering
 Mechanical Marine Engineering ( with ISO 9001:2000 Quality Assurance Standard)

Location 
The institute is situated near the Bandaranaike International Airport, Katunayake at 18th Milepost on Colombo Negombo Road. The distance is around 30 km from Colombo and it takes around 45–60 minutes to reach the institute via main road or from  Colombo-Katunayake Expressway it can reach around 15 minutes.

References

External links 
 Official web portal

Technical universities and colleges in Sri Lanka
Educational institutions established in 1985
Education in Gampaha District
Universities and colleges in Western Province, Sri Lanka
1985 establishments in Sri Lanka